Where Love Has Gone is a 1964 American Technicolor drama film in Techniscope made by Embassy Pictures, Joseph E. Levine Productions and Paramount Pictures. It was directed by Edward Dmytryk and produced by Joseph E. Levine from a screenplay by John Michael Hayes based on the 1962 novel of the same name by Harold Robbins. The music score was by Walter Scharf, the cinematography by Joseph MacDonald and the costume design by Edith Head.

The film stars Susan Hayward and Bette Davis with Mike Connors, Joey Heatherton, Jane Greer, DeForest Kelley, Anne Seymour, and George Macready.

Plot
The film begins with headlines stating that 15-year-old Danielle Miller (Joey Heatherton) has murdered a man, Rick Lazich, who was the latest lover of her mother Valerie Hayden (Susan Hayward). Dani's father, Luke Miller (Mike Connors) describes the events that led to the tragedy.

Near the end of World War II, Army Air Forces hero Miller is in San Francisco for a parade in his honor, and meets Valerie Hayden at an art show where one of her works is being exhibited. He is invited to dinner by Valerie's mother, Mrs. Gerald Hayden (Bette Davis), who offers him a job and dowry as an enticement for him to marry Valerie. He storms from the house but is followed by Valerie who says she is unable to go against her mother's wishes but that she admires him for having refused her. A relationship develops and the two marry, although a former suitor, Sam Corwin (DeForest Kelley) predicts that the marriage will fail.

As time passes, Luke Miller becomes a successful architect and refuses another offer of employment from his mother-in-law, however the influential and vindictive Mrs. Hayden uses her contacts in the banking industry to ensure that Miller is refused loans to help him build his business. He relents and accepts a position in Mrs. Hayden's company. Their daughter, Dani, is born but the relationship of the couple begins to deteriorate with Miller declining into alcoholism, and Valerie indulging in a promiscuous lifestyle. The marriage ends when Miller actually finds her having sex with another man and Mrs. Hayden insists she divorce him. Years pass and Dani eventually becomes her mother's rival for the same man.

Back in the present, Dani claims that she was defending Valerie against attack, and when the case is brought to court, a verdict of justifiable homicide is ruled. An investigation into where to place Dani begins, but neither investigator Marian Spicer (Jane Greer) nor psychiatrist Dr. Jennings (Anne Seymour) can persuade Dani to open up about her feelings. When Mrs. Hayden petitions for custody of Dani and she still refuses to reveal herself, Valerie reveals that Dani was trying to kill her, and that Rick was only killed when he tried to defend Valerie.   Valerie returns home and commits suicide, and after her death Luke Miller tries to help Dani rebuild her life.

Cast
 Susan Hayward as Valerie Hayden Miller
 Bette Davis as Mrs. Gerald Hayden
 Mike Connors as Maj. Luke Miller (as Michael Connors)
 Joey Heatherton as Danielle Valerie Miller
 Jane Greer as Marian Spicer
 DeForest Kelley as Sam Corwin
 George Macready as Gordon Harris
 Anne Seymour as Dr. Sally Jennings
 Willis Bouchey as Judge Murphy
 Walter Reed as George Babson
 Ann Doran as Mrs. Geraghty
 Bartlett Robinson as Mr. John Coleman
 Whit Bissell as Prof. Bell
 Anthony Caruso as Rafael

Critical response
Although Robbins and the studio refused to acknowledge a connection, some publications such as Newsweek noted the similarities between the movie and the real-life case of Cheryl Crane, the daughter of actress Lana Turner, who in 1958 stabbed and killed her mother's boyfriend, Johnny Stompanato, claiming that she was defending Turner from attack. Newsweek wrote that the case seemed to have influenced the "foolish story" and described it as "a typical Harold Robbins pastiche of newspaper clippings liberally shellacked with sentiment and glued with sex".

The Saturday Review criticized the script saying that it "somehow manages to make every dramatic line (particularly when uttered by Susan Hayward) sound like a caption to a cartoon in The New Yorker.

Nominations
The theme song "Where Love Has Gone" by Jimmy Van Heusen and Sammy Cahn was nominated for both an Academy Award and Golden Globe in the "Best Song" category.  Jack Jones sang the theme song on his album of the same name.

Notes and references

External links
 
 
 
 
 

1964 films
American drama films
Paramount Pictures films
Films à clef
Films based on American novels
Films directed by Edward Dmytryk
Films scored by Walter Scharf
Films set in San Francisco
Films about dysfunctional families
Adultery in films
Embassy Pictures films
1960s English-language films
1960s American films